Human Butt is the fifth live spoken word album by Henry Rollins, released in 1992 by Quarterstick Records. It was reissued with new artwork on 2.13.61 Records on February 3, 2009. It is made up of recordings from 1989 and 1990 from Chicago, IL, Santa Monica, CA, Hamburg, Germany and Lausanne, Switzerland.

On the 2009 reissue track listing, "Hated" is not listed, and it shows "Decoration" as the first track of disc two. They run consecutively and are the only two tracks to be included from the same performance.

Liner Notes

– Henry Rollins

Track listing

Disc 1
"Adventures of An Asshole" – 52:03
Recorded in Chicago, IL 1989
"Kicked In the Ass By Adventure" – 2:13
Recorded in Santa Monica, CA 1989
"Smokin' the Filter" – 17:16
Recorded in Hamburg, Germany 1989

Disc 2
"Hated" – 14:25
Recorded in Santa Monica, CA 1990
"Decoration" – 23:28
Recorded in Santa Monica, CA 1990
"Donate Your Bodies To Science You Fools!" – 27:30
Recorded in Chicago, IL 1990
"Romance" – 8:24
Recorded in Lausanne, Switzerland 1989)

1992 live albums
Henry Rollins live albums
Live spoken word albums
Live comedy albums
Spoken word albums by American artists
Quarterstick Records live albums